The Harambe statue is a seven-foot-tall sculpture of the deceased western lowland gorilla Harambe in bronze which suddenly appeared on Monday October 18, 2021, on Wall Street, New York City, New York, facing the Charging Bull statue. Beneath Charging Bull were 10,000 bananas (later donated to charity) which could be interpreted as the greed of Wall Street. The statue of Harambe (former resident of the Cincinnati Zoo) was alone and in a casual half-sitting position, appearing to stare defiantly at the bull and its banana hoard.

Sculpture and artist 
The bronze sculpture was apparently cast in five pieces by using a "lost wax technique", and soldered together by an unrevealed artist commissioned by Ankit Bhatia and Robert Giometti of the group Sapien.Network.

Group behind statement 
Sapien.Network founders Ankit Bhatia and Robert Giometti said they used the symbol of Harambe to represent the millions who struggle under a U.S. capitalist system they say "enriches wealthy elites and leaves the average person behind." They have a website (sapien.network) and a blog.

Reception 
Multiple news agencies reported on the Harambe statue, with talk on social media sites such as YouTube, Reddit, and Twitter about wealth disparity and the manipulation of the stock market by large Wall Street investment groups.
The news of the Bronze Harambe statue reached beyond North America and NBC New York's initial covering of the statue. The French newspaper Libération showed an interest in the incident, saying that people clearly have had enough of capitalism's greed and that the erection of this statue on Wall Street showed this anger.

NBC New York stated in the article:

The organizers, founders of Sapien.Network, an in-development social networking platform "dedicated to putting the needs and welfare of human beings first" said they put up the display to show that Wall Street has become "bananas" -- wholly out of touch with the needs of everyday people.

WCPO Cincinnatis article about "The gorilla that was shot at Cincinnati Zoo becomes symbol against big finance" stated:

A statue of Harambe, the gorilla from the Cincinnati Zoo, faces Arturo Di Modica's "Charging Bull", surrounded by bananas, in New York's Financial District, Monday, Oct. 18, 2021. The gorilla statue and bananas were part of a protest against wealth disparity by Sapien.Network, who says that the fruit will later be distributed to local food banks.

See also
 Gorilla, 1961 sculpture in London

Notes

References 

Bowling Green (New York City)
2021 sculptures
Animal sculptures in New York City
2021 establishments in New York City
Bronze sculptures in Manhattan
Financial District, Manhattan
Gorillas in art
Primates in popular culture